Nor Hashimah Ismail (born 6 April 1971) is a Malaysian lawn bowler.

Bowls career

World Championships
In 2008, Ismail won a bronze medal in the fours at the 2008 World Outdoor Bowls Championship. Eight years later in 2016, she won a second bronze medal, with Azlina Arshad and Nur Fidrah Noh in the triples at the 2016 World Outdoor Bowls Championship in Christchurch.

Commonwealth Games
Nor competed in both the women's pairs and women's fours events at the 2014 Commonwealth Games. She failed to qualify from the group stages in the women's pairs event but won a silver medal in the women's fours

Other events
She has won eleven medals at the Asia Pacific Bowls Championships including three gold medals. In 2010, she won the Hong Kong International Bowls Classic singles title and previously had won the 2008 pairs title with Siti Zalina Ahmad.

She has also won four gold medals in the Lawn bowls at the Southeast Asian Games.

References

External links
  (2006–2010)
  (2014)
 
 

1971 births
Living people
Malaysian female bowls players
Commonwealth Games medallists in lawn bowls
Commonwealth Games gold medallists for Malaysia
Commonwealth Games silver medallists for Malaysia
Commonwealth Games bronze medallists for Malaysia
Bowls players at the 1998 Commonwealth Games
Bowls players at the 2006 Commonwealth Games
Bowls players at the 2010 Commonwealth Games
Bowls players at the 2014 Commonwealth Games
Southeast Asian Games medalists in lawn bowls
Southeast Asian Games gold medalists for Malaysia
Competitors at the 1999 Southeast Asian Games
Competitors at the 2001 Southeast Asian Games
Competitors at the 2005 Southeast Asian Games
Competitors at the 2007 Southeast Asian Games
Competitors at the 2017 Southeast Asian Games
Asian Games competitors for Malaysia
Malaysian people of Malay descent
Malaysian Muslims
People from Selangor
Medallists at the 1998 Commonwealth Games
Medallists at the 2006 Commonwealth Games
Medallists at the 2010 Commonwealth Games
Medallists at the 2014 Commonwealth Games